Viña Tarapacá Airport ,  is an airport located  southwest of Isla de Maipo, a town in the Santiago Metropolitan Region of Chile.

The runway lies along the Maipo River. There is distant rising terrain west of the airport.

See also

Transport in Chile
List of airports in Chile

References

External links
OpenStreetMap - Viña Tarapacá
OurAirports - Viña Tarapacá
FallingRain - Viña Tarapacá Airport

Airports in Chile
Airports in Santiago Metropolitan Region